German submarine U-226 was a Type VIIC U-boat that served with the Kriegsmarine during World War II. Laid down on 1 August 1941 as yard number 656 at F. Krupp Germaniawerft in Kiel, she was launched on 18 June 1942 and commissioned on 1 August under the command of Oberleutnant zur See Albrecht Gänge.

She began her service career in training with the 5th U-boat Flotilla. She was transferred to the 6th flotilla on 1 January 1943.

The boat was a member of eleven wolfpacks. She carried out three patrols and sank one ship.

She was sunk by British warships on 6 November 1943.

Design
German Type VIIC submarines were preceded by the shorter Type VIIB submarines. U-226 had a displacement of  when at the surface and  while submerged. She had two shafts and two  propellers.

U-226 was fitted with five  torpedo tubes (four fitted at the bow and one at the stern), fourteen torpedoes, one  SK C/35 naval gun, 220 rounds, and an anti-aircraft gun. The boat had a complement of between forty-four and sixty.

Service history

First patrol
U-226 departed Kiel on 31 December 1942, heading for the Atlantic Ocean via the gap between Iceland and the Faroe Islands. She sailed toward Newfoundland, southeast of Greenland. She arrived at Lorient in occupied France, on 17 May.

Second patrol
Having left Lorient on 10 April 1943, the boat encountered the Fort Rampart west of the Bay of Biscay on the 18th. U-226 finished the merchantman off with a 'coup de grǎce' torpedo and gunfire and returned to France; this time to St. Nazaire.

Third patrol
Having left St. Nazaire for Brest, the boat departed the port in Brittany on 5 October. Fifty-one men died, there were no survivors.

Wolfpacks
U-226 took part in eleven wolfpacks, namely:
 Falke (8 – 12 January 1943) 
 Habicht (10 – 19 January 1943) 
 Haudegen (19 January – 15 February 1943) 
 Sturmbock (24 – 26 February 1943) 
 Without name (15 – 18 April 1943) 
 Specht (19 April – 4 May 1943) 
 Fink (4 – 5 May 1943) 
 Siegfried (22 – 27 October 1943) 
 Siegfried 3 (27 – 30 October 1943) 
 Jahn (30 October – 2 November 1943) 
 Tirpitz 4 (2 – 6 November 1943)

Summary of raiding history

References

Bibliography

External links

World War II submarines of Germany
German Type VIIC submarines
U-boats commissioned in 1942
Ships built in Kiel
U-boats sunk in 1944
U-boats sunk by British warships
World War II shipwrecks in the Atlantic Ocean
1942 ships
Ships lost with all hands
Maritime incidents in November 1943